Spero Dedes (born February 27, 1979) is an American sportscaster. He is currently employed by CBS Sports, calling the NBA, NFL, and college basketball. He has also worked as the play-by-play announcer for the Los Angeles Chargers during the preseason and for the NBA on TNT. Prior to joining CBS, he was the radio play-by-play announcer for the Los Angeles Lakers (2005-2011) and a radio and television play-by-play announcer for the New York Knicks from 2011 to 2014.

Early career: WFAN, AFL, YES Network, NBA TV
Dedes was born in Paramus, New Jersey. He attended Paramus High School and then graduated from Fordham University in 2001. He began his career at WFAN in New York.

In 2001 and 2002, Dedes was the radio announcer for the New Jersey Gladiators of the AFL. In 2002, he was tapped as a fill-in announcer for New Jersey Nets games on the YES Network.

In 2003, Dedes was hired as a studio host and play-by-play man for NBA TV. He hosted Hardwood Classics and The Insiders.

In 2004, Dedes was hired as a voice over for NBA Action replaced longtime voice over Jim Fagan until he was replaced by YES Network play–by–play announcer Ian Eagle.

National exposure: Olympics, Networks, Lakers, Super Bowl
At 24, Dedes worked the 2004 Summer Olympics for NBC Sports.

In 2004, Dedes also served as a fill-in commentator of College Basketball on CBS. Also in 2004, Dedes served as a fill-in commentator for the NFL on FOX.

In 2005, Dedes filled in on the NFL on CBS.

In 2005, Dedes got the biggest break of his career when he was hired as the radio announcer for the Los Angeles Lakers.

From 2006 until 2011, Dedes worked for NFL Network. His duties included studio hosting and play-by-play. In 2015, Dedes went back to his old stomping grounds by returning to NFL Network as a studio host.

In 2007, Dedes served as the play-by-play man for the international feed of Super Bowl XLI by CBS Sports.

Full-time at CBS and New York Knicks
In December 2009, Dedes joined CBS Sports full-time, calling regular season college basketball and the 2010 NCAA Tournament.

For the 2010 NFL season, he was named a full-time announcer of the NFL on CBS.

In 2011, Dedes left the Lakers and became the radio voice of the New York Knicks.  Dedes cited the flexibility to continue his work at CBS Sports as the reason for leaving the Lakers.

In addition, that fall, he became the #2 voice of the SEC on CBS behind Verne Lundquist.

Dedes has also filled in for Ian Eagle on play-by-play for New York Jets preseason games on WCBS-TV.

Between 2017 and 2021 he called NFL games with Adam Archuleta and since 2021 has been paired with Jay Feely as the No. 6 announcing team for the NFL on CBS. Dedes and Archuleta were on the call for the Snow Bowl where the Buffalo Bills beat the Indianapolis Colts on December 10, 2017. He's also the No. 4 play-by-play announcer for the NBA on TNT and continues to work play-by-play on CBS and Turner’s coverage of NCAA March Madness pairing with an array of analysts including Steve Smith, Jim Jackson, Len Elmore and Debbie Antonelli.

References

External links

American people of Greek descent
American radio sports announcers
American television sports announcers
College basketball announcers in the United States
College football announcers
Fordham University alumni
Los Angeles Chargers announcers
Los Angeles Lakers announcers
National Basketball Association broadcasters
National Football League announcers
People from Paramus, New Jersey
1979 births
Living people
Arena football announcers
Paramus High School alumni
Olympic Games broadcasters
Alliance of American Football announcers
WFUV people